Rüdiger Hild (born 23 April 1949) is a German volleyball player. He competed in the men's tournament at the 1972 Summer Olympics.

References

1949 births
Living people
German men's volleyball players
Olympic volleyball players of West Germany
Volleyball players at the 1972 Summer Olympics
Sportspeople from Darmstadt